Simpson Foulis (January 24, 1884 – November 19, 1951) was an American golfer. He competed in the men's individual event at the 1904 Summer Olympics.

References

External links
 

1884 births
1937 deaths
Amateur golfers
American male golfers
Olympic golfers of the United States
Golfers at the 1904 Summer Olympics
Golfers from St Andrews